Eustace George Willis (7 March 1903 – 2 June 1987) was a British Labour Party politician.  He was elected as Member of Parliament for Edinburgh North at the 1945 general election, but was defeated at the 1950 general election. He stood again in Edinburgh North at the 1951 election, but was defeated again.

He was returned to the House of Commons as MP for Edinburgh East at a 1954 by-election, and served until his retirement at the 1970 general election. He was Minister of State for Scotland from 1964 to 1967 in the first and second Wilson ministries.

References

External links 
 

1903 births
1987 deaths
Members of the Parliament of the United Kingdom for Edinburgh constituencies
Members of the Privy Council of the United Kingdom
Ministers in the Wilson governments, 1964–1970
People educated at the City of Norwich School
Scottish Labour MPs
UK MPs 1945–1950
UK MPs 1951–1955
UK MPs 1955–1959
UK MPs 1959–1964
UK MPs 1964–1966
UK MPs 1966–1970